Holmesund or Holmsund is a village in Arendal municipality in Agder county, Norway. Holmsund is considered by Statistics Norway to be part of the Kilsund urban area.

References

Villages in Agder
Arendal